"Helele" is a Zulu language song by South African singer Velile Mchunu and Danish percussion duo Safri Duo. It was released on 7 May 2010 as the only new single from Safri Duo's Greatest Hits album. The song was the official trailer song for the 2010 FIFA World Cup broadcast on German television channel RTL and Switzerland's Schweizer Fernsehen and Télévision Suisse Romande in June–July. "Helele" is based on the 1971 song "Aieaoa" by French producer Daniel Vangarde and Belgian producer Jean Kluger in the group Yamasuki. It was famously covered by Belgian group Black Blood in 1975 and English girl group Bananarama in 1981. "Helele" peaked at number one in Switzerland, number two in Germany and number eight in Austria.

On 29 August 2010, "Helele" has won an award for "Best International Single of the Summer" during the 2010 Bydgoszcz Hit Festival in Poland.

Track listing
CD single
"Helele" (Safri Duo Single Mix) – 3:07
"Helele" (Single House Mix) – 3:27

Digital download #1
"Helele" (Safri Duo Single Mix) – 3:07
"Helele" (Single House Mix) – 3:27
"Helele" (Flipside & Michael Parsberg Remix) – 5:52

Digital download #2
"Helele" (Tribal Pop Mix) – 3:27
"Helele" (Safri Duo Extended Mix) – 5:05
"Helele" (Klaas Club Edit) – 5:30
"Helele" (Klaas Radio Edit) – 2:59
"Helele" (Kato Remix) – 7:11
"Helele" (Kato Remix Edit) – 4:00

Personnel
 Jean Kluger – songwriting
 Daniel Vangarde – songwriting
 Velile Mchunu – lyrics
 Hardy Krech – production
 Mark Nissen – production
 Tonekind – co-production

Source:

Charts and certifications

Charts

Year-end charts

Certifications

References

2010 singles
Songs written by Daniel Vangarde
Number-one singles in Israel
Number-one singles in Switzerland
Songs written by Jean Kluger
Polydor Records singles
2010 songs